The King's Cupboard was a Canadian children's television series which aired on CBC Television in 1958.

Premise
This children's series included puppetry and poetry as presented by characters named Dee Dee, Cuthbert Caterpillar, Jack and King.

Scheduling
This 15-minute series was broadcast Mondays at 5:00 p.m. (Eastern time) from 20 January to 31 March 1958.

References

External links
 

CBC Television original programming
1958 Canadian television series debuts
1958 Canadian television series endings
1950s Canadian children's television series
Black-and-white Canadian television shows
Canadian television shows featuring puppetry